Enteromius nounensis is a species of ray-finned fish in the genus Enteromius, it is endemic to Cameroon.

Footnotes 

 

Endemic fauna of Cameroon
Enteromius
Taxa named by Ericia C. Van den Bergh
Taxa named by Guy G. Teugels
Fish described in 1998